Nasaan Ka Maruja ( Where Are You Maruja?) is a Philippine weekly television series aired from May 2 to August 8, 2009 on ABS-CBN. It was adapted from the 1967 movie Maruja, itself based on a 1950s comic by Mars Ravelo. The series premiered on the Komiks Presents showcase which featured works of Ravelo.

Origins

Earlier versions
Maruja is one of Mars Ravelo's masterpieces. He first published it in comics during the 1950s. In 1967, the first film entitled Maruja was released starring the queen of Philippine movies, Susan Roces. The movie was remade in 1978 as Gumising Ka Maruja and again in 1996 as Maruja starring Carmina Villaroel.

Series adaptation
In 2007, ABS-CBN bought the rights to make Maruja into a TV series. Maruja was supposed to be included in Sineserye Presents: The Susan Roces Cinema Collection, which featured Susan Roces' most classical films. It was supposed to star Sheryl Cruz and Ruffa Gutierrez. But even before production began, the Ravelos stated that Mars Ravelo's name should be included in the title because Maruja is his work and not the movie firm's. ABS-CBN then decided to put the show's production on hold until the problem was fixed. A year later, ABS-CBN then released Nasaan Ka Maruja? as part of Komiks Presents which featured Mars Ravelos masterpieces. New actors and actresses were also involved in the project, because of some problems.

Synopsis
Cristy dreams of a certain couple, Maruja and Gabriel, who had a hard time being together because of their different status in life. They were both killed after getting married. Little did Cristy know that she and Ross, her half-sister's fiancé, would bring back to life the unfinished love story of Maruja and Gabriel.

Reincarnation
The storyline deals with the concept of reincarnation: Maruja (Kristine Hermosa) reincarnated as Cristy & Gabriel (Derek Ramsey) reincarnated as Ross. Cristy Rivera (Kristine Hermosa) is a magazine columnist who possesses psychic & paranormal abilities that help her see ghosts. She has a half-sister named Helen (Karylle) who is engaged to Ross Lozano. Ross used to draw sketches of Maruja even before they met in real life. What is the connection of Cristy & Ross to Maruja & Gabriel? Will Ross totally leave Helen for Cristy? And what will be Helen's move?
Cristy having an open third eye has the ability to see ghosts or dead people and to communicate and to talk to them.

Mediumship
Cristy believes that she has the ability to see the spirits or ghosts of dead people. This brings the idea of having a third eye but is also able to dream about the past or even see the future through dreams. Later, a ghost of her mother shows to her explaining what exactly is this ability and that she should use this gift to help other spirits to cross the light, at the same time, knowing her true identity.

Cast and characters

Main cast
Kristine Hermosa as Maruja S. Martinez/Cristy Mondes Rivera† – Gabriel's love interest in the past when she was Maruja and as Cristy, a magazine columnist who possesses psychic and paranormal abilities and helps dead people who are not in peace. She falls in love with her sister's fiancé, Ross. She is haunted by a persistent and vague dreams of Maruja and Gabriel.
Derek Ramsay as Rodrigo Santiago/Ross Lozano – Maruja's fiancé in the past when he was Romualdo and when he is Ross, he is marrying Cristy's half-sister, Helen. He falls in love with Cristy. He has visions of Cristy as Maruja. Ross also experiences dreams of Maruja & Gabriel. He has drawn Maruja when he was younger and then starts drawing Cristy. Ross confessed he has feelings for Cristy because he has a dream of her as Maruja. Ross reveals the truth to Helen (Karylle) that he is in love with another woman which is Helen's half-sister, Cristy. In the past, he killed Gabriel (Piolo Pascual) and Maruja and after that he killed himself. In the present, he accidentally killed Cristy but Cristy survived.
Karylle as Helen Rivera† – Cristy's half sister who is engaged to Ross. Helen discovers Cristy is the girl in Ross' sketches. She discovers Ross & Cristy's relationship. She died after knowing Ross' and Cristy's relationship. She has been haunting Cristy but doesn't want to connect. Helen is willing to protect Cristy from Ross.

Supporting cast
John Estrada as Michael – an editor-in-chief in a magazine where Cristy works, who is also in love with her.
Enchong Dee as Brian Lorenzo – Ross' brother: He learns the secret of Ross as Gabriel in the past.
Gloria Romero as Lola Rosing – Cristy and Helen's grandmother. It was alter revealed that she also have the same ability as Cristy.
Kitkat as Debbie – Cristy's best friend who works together with Cristy as a magazine columnist.
Bing Pimentel as Shirley Rivera –  Alfred's second wife. She finds it hard to accept Cristy as her stepdaughter
Menggie Cobarrubias as Alfred Rivera – Cristy and Helen's father.
Raquel Villavicencio as Mirasol Lozano – Brian and Ross' mother. She divorced their father after knowing that he's having an affair with another woman.

Guests by episode

Episode 1: Stefanie
Tirso Cruz III as Dr. Joselito L. Ocampo Jr. – a doctor who suffers miserably due to the recent death of his wife. He later committed suicide.
Assunta de Rossi as Stefanie Miranda – Dr. Ocampo's wife, who wants Cristy to tell her husband that its time to move on and stop him from committing suicide.

Episode 2 and 3: Teddy
Mat Ranillo III as Teodoro "Teddy" Lozano – Brian & Ross's father – Ross and Brian's father who rejected his family but recently came back for Ross' wedding. Unfortunately he died in a car accident and wanted to communicate with his family through Cristy.

Episode 4 and 5: Jenny
Andre Tiangco as Raul Sandoval – Jenny's father who was trying to be strong after his only child's death.
Yayo Aguila as Brenda Sandoval – Jenny's mother who still feels awful after her daughter's death.
Angel Sy as Jenny – a ghost of a little girl who died in an illness. She stays in a hospital bed and can't move on unless she would be able to talk to her parents.
Francis Magundayao as Myrno "Boy" Alicante

Episode 6: Diane
Dimples Romana as Dianne Gomez – she died with cancer and later found at as a ghost that her husband is having an affair with her best friend. She then started to startle every woman who comes near her husband including Cristy.
Baron Geisler as Jeff Gomez – Dianne's husband. He loves his wife, but  admits that he had an affair with his wife's best friend.
Ina Feleo as Aimee – Dianne's best friend who had an affair with Jeff.

Episode 7: Caloy
James Blanco as Caloy Rueda –  a ghost of a security guard who was murdered in the same building where Cristy works.
LJ Moreno as Linda – the security guard's girlfriend who he wants to warn that her new man is the one who killed Caloy.
Ryan Eigenmann as Jimmy – Linda's new boyfriend, who actually killed Linda's former boyfriend, Caloy.

Episode 8 and 9: Sammy
Nicole Uysiuseng  as Levi
Julia Montes as Maura
John Manalo as Lino
Joshua Dionisio as Perry
Quintin Alianza as Sammy

Episode 10: James
Coco Martin as James – the ghost of Leila's ex-boyfriend, he is a drug addict and thinks that the ghost of a guy named Edgardo is haunting him. He seeks help from Cristy after dying from an overdose of sleeping pills.
Maja Salvador as Leila – James' ex-girlfriend. She was supposed to leave for Canada but after finding out that James died, she changed her mind.
Joross Gamboa as Edgardo – the man who Leila and James accidentally killed after drunk driving. He was haunting James when he was alive, forcing him to resort to using pills which led to his overdose.
Nikki Bacolod as Sarah – Edgardo's wife, she received a letter from James before he died.
Carlo Aquino as Randolf – friend of James and Leila.

Episode 11: The Real Gabriel
Piolo Pascual as Gabriel Montero – the mysterious man who is connected to Maruja's life. It was later revealed that he was the man Maruja is running away with, and not Ross' past self.
Jairus Aquino as Young Gabriel
Alexa Ilacad as Young Maruja
Melissa Mendez as Maruja's mother

Episode 12: Romualdo
Dante Rivero as Old Gabriel (present time)

Movies

1967 original movie cast
Susan Roces as Maruja Isabel Sevilla Y Vira/Cristy Rivera
Romeo Vasquez as Gabriel
Eddie Garcia as Rodrigo
Luis Gonzales as Rosanno Gabriel
Nello Nayo as Don Igmindo
Mary Walter as Doña Concha
Caridad Sanchez as Petra
Etang Discher
Perla Bautista
Dely Villanueva
Andres Centenera
Paquito Salcedo
Felisa Salcedo
Jay Ilagan
Angel Confiado

1978 Movie remake cast
Susan Roces as  Maruja Isabella Sevilla/Nina Concepcion
Phillip Salvador as Marco Lorenzo/Rodrigo De Velasquez
Mario O' Hara as Freddie
Laurice Guillen as Cristy
Joel Torre as Joel
Manny Ojeda as Señor Juan Miguel
Mary Walter as Señora Agida
Ronnie Lazaro as Vergel
Peque Gallaga

1996 Movie remake cast
Carmina Villaroel as Maruja Isabel Sevilla/Nina Concepcion
Rustom Padilla as Marco Lorenzo
Eric Quizon
Albert Martinez
Jaclyn Jose

See also
List of Komiks episodes
Isang Lakas

References

External links
 Nasaan Ka Maruja PEP
 Derek Ramsay crushes on Kristine Hermosa
 Nasaan Ka Maruja ABS CBN
 Nasaan Ka Maruja Kristine sees ghosts in NKM
 Nassan Ka Maruja PEP

2009 Philippine television series debuts
2009 Philippine television series endings
Television series by Dreamscape Entertainment Television
Philippine horror fiction television series
ABS-CBN drama series
Filipino-language television shows